Safien is a former municipality in the district of Surselva in the Swiss canton of Graubünden.  The municipalities of Valendas, Versam, Safien and Tenna merged on 1 January 2013 into the new municipality of Safiental.

History
Safien is first mentioned in 1219 as Stosavia.

Geography

Of this area, 45.6% is used for agricultural purposes, while 18.2% is forested. Of the rest of the land, 0.8% is settled (buildings or roads) and the remainder (35.4%) is non-productive (rivers, glaciers or mountains).

The former municipality was the capital of the Safien sub-district of the Surselva district in the mid and upper Safien valley.  The only other municipality in the sub-district was Tenna, which occupied the lower Safien valley.  The valley is drained by the Rabiusa river.

The former municipality consists of the village of Safien-Platz and scattered hamlets and single farm houses throughout the valley.

Coat of arms
The blazon of the municipal coat of arms is Gules a Cross gyronny Argent and Sable  It is based on the simple design of the sub-district, with different colors.

Demographics
Safien had a population (as of 2011) of 294.  , 0.3% of the population was made up of foreign nationals.  Over the last 10 years the population has decreased at a rate of -15%.  Most of the population speaks German (96.1%), with Italian being second most common ( 1.6%) and Albanian being third ( 1.6%).

, the gender distribution of the population was 49.5% male and 50.5% female.  The age distribution, in Safien is; 49 children or 15.9% of the population are between 0 and 9 years old and 43 teenagers or 14.0% are between 10 and 19.  Of the adult population, 24 people or 7.8% of the population are between 20 and 29 years old.  37 people or 12.0% are between 30 and 39, 39 people or 12.7% are between 40 and 49, and 36 people or 11.7% are between 50 and 59.  The senior population distribution is 30 people or 9.7% of the population are between 60 and 69 years old, 28 people or 9.1% are between 70 and 79, there are 18 people or 5.8% who are between 80 and 89,and there are 4 people or 1.3% who are between 90 and 99.

In the 2007 federal election the most popular party was the SVP which received 62.4% of the vote.  The next three most popular parties were the SP (18.8%), the FDP (7.4%) and the CVP (5.4%).

In Safien about 61.7% of the population (between age 25-64) have completed either non-mandatory upper secondary education or additional higher education (either university or a Fachhochschule).

Safien has an unemployment rate of 0.46%.  , there were 89 people employed in the primary economic sector and about 35 businesses involved in this sector.  15 people are employed in the secondary sector and there are 3 businesses in this sector.  32 people are employed in the tertiary sector, with 12 businesses in this sector.

The historical population is given in the following table:

References

External links

Official website (in German)

Safiental
Villages in Graubünden
Former municipalities of Graubünden